Mark Lenard (born Leonard Rosenson, October 15, 1924 – November 22, 1996) was an American actor, primarily in television. His most famous role was as Sarek, father of Spock, in the science fiction Star Trek franchise, in both the original and animated series, as well as three films and two episodes of Star Trek: The Next Generation. He also played a Klingon in Star Trek The Motion Picture, and a Romulan in an episode of Star Trek: The Original Series.

Biography
Lenard was born in Chicago, the son of a Russian Jewish immigrant, Abraham, and his wife, Bessie, but was raised in the small town of South Haven, Michigan, on Lake Michigan, where his family owned a tourist resort. He joined the United States Army in 1943 and trained to be a paratrooper during World War II but did not see combat and was discharged in 1946 as a technical sergeant.

He got his start on stage while in the army. After earning a master's degree in theater and speech from the University of Michigan, he became known in New York City for serious drama, including Ibsen, Shaw, and Chekhov. His first notable role was that of Conrad in John Gielgud's production of Much Ado About Nothing. In the mid-1960s, he moved his family to Los Angeles, where he played a recurring role of Dr. Ernest Gregory in Another World, and one of the Three Wise Men in the biblical epic The Greatest Story Ever Told (1965).

Lenard is best known for his appearances in the Star Trek franchise, particularly in the role of Sarek, the father of Spock (Leonard Nimoy).  His first Star Trek appearance was in the first season of Star Trek: The Original Series, however, playing the first Romulan ever seen in the series, in the episode "Balance of Terror" (1966).  He originated the character of Sarek in the second-season episode "Journey to Babel" (1967), and provided the voice of Sarek in the Star Trek: The Animated Series episode "Yesteryear" (1973). He later played an ill-fated Klingon Captain in Star Trek: The Motion Picture (1979), which gave him the distinction of being the first actor to play a Romulan, a Vulcan, and a Klingon in Star Trek.  He reprised the role of Sarek in three of the Star Trek feature films: Star Trek III: The Search for Spock (1984), Star Trek IV: The Voyage Home (1986), and Star Trek VI: The Undiscovered Country (1991), and provided the voice of young Sarek in a brief flashback sequence in Star Trek V: The Final Frontier (1989). Additionally, he appeared as the elderly Sarek in the third-season Star Trek: The Next Generation episode "Sarek" (1990) and the fifth-season episode "Unification: Part 1" (1991).

Lenard began acting in television series dramas and TV movies in 1955. He was the fifth actor to play Nathan Walsh in the soap opera Search for Tomorrow (1959-1960). He played Dr. Ernest Gregory in Another World (1964-1965). Lenard guest-starred in several episodes of the original Mission: Impossible from 1966 to 1970, including one with Leonard Nimoy, and in a two-part episode of Buck Rogers in the 25th Century. He played the prosecutor in Fort Grant in the Clint Eastwood film Hang 'Em High (1968). He also played the character Aaron Stempel in the television series Here Come the Brides, and the hostile gorilla Urko in the television series Planet of the Apes. He made a guest appearance on Little House on the Prairie in the episode "Journey in the Spring, Part I", playing Peter Ingalls, older brother of Charles Ingalls. He had roles in Gunsmoke several times, including in the episode "Nowhere to Run" (1968).

Lenard played a lead role in the film Noon Sunday, filmed on Guam with costars Keye Luke, TV series star John Russell from Lawman, and character actor Stacy Harris. In The Radicals (1990), which recounted the beginnings of the Swiss Anabaptist movement in the 1520s, he played a composite historical character, Eberhard Hoffman, a Catholic bishop who serves as prosecutor in the trial of his former abbot Michael Sattler. In 1993, Lenard and fellow Star Trek actor Walter Koenig toured in a production of The Boys in Autumn. Lenard played a late middle-aged Huck Finn who re-encounters his childhood friend Tom Sawyer after a lifetime apart. Koenig played Sawyer.

Lenard died of multiple myeloma in New York City in 1996 at the age of 72.

Filmography

Film
 The Greatest Story Ever Told (1965) - Balthazar
 Hang 'Em High (1968) - Prosecuting Attorney at Fort Grant 
 Noon Sunday (1970) - Jason Cootes
 Annie Hall (1977) - Navy Officer
 Getting Married (1978) - Mr. Bloom
 Star Trek: The Motion Picture (1979) - Klingon Captain
 Star Trek III: The Search for Spock (1984) - Ambassador Sarek
 Star Trek IV: The Voyage Home (1986) - Ambassador Sarek
 Star Trek V: The Final Frontier (1989) - Ambassador Sarek (voice)
 The Radicals (1990) - Eberhard Hoffmann
 Star Trek VI: The Undiscovered Country (1991) - Ambassador Sarek

Television
 Search for Tomorrow (1959-1960) - Nathan Walsh
 Armstrong Circle Theatre: "Ghost Bomber: The Lady Be Good" (1960) - Major Bennett
 Another World (1964-1965) - Dr. Ernest Gregory
 Mission: Impossible: "Wheels" (1966) - Felipe Mora
 Star Trek: "Balance of Terror" (1966) - Romulan Commander
 Star Trek: "Journey to Babel" (1967) - Sarek
 The Wild Wild West: "The Night of the Iron Fist" (1967) - Count Draja
 Gunsmoke: "No Where to Run" (1968) - Ira Stonecipher
 Here Come the Brides (1968–1970) - Aaron Stempel
 Mission: Impossible: "Nitro" (1969) - Aristo Skora
 Hawaii Five-O: "To Hell with Babe Ruth" (1969) - Yoshio Nagata
 Mission: Impossible: "The Rebel" (1970) - Colonel Bakram
 Hawaii Five-O: "Will the Real Mr. Winkler Please Die" (Season 5, episode 19, 1973) - Rogloff
 Star Trek: The Animated Series: "Yesteryear" (1973) - Sarek (voice)
 Mannix: "Desert Run" (1973) - Hal Morgan
 Planet of the Apes: "TV Series" (1974) - General Urko
 Hawaii Five-O: "Secret Witness" (1974) - Dan Bock
 Little House on the Prairie: "Journey in the Spring" (1976) - Peter Ingalls
 The Bob Newhart Show: "Carlin's New Suit" (1977) - Earl Stanley Plummer
 Hawaii Five-O: "You Don't See Many Pirates These Days" (1977) - Commander Hawkins
 The Secret Empire (TV series) (1979) - Emperor Thorval
 The Incredible Hulk (TV series) (1979) - Mr. Slater
 Buck Rogers in the 25th Century: "Journey to Oasis" (1981) - Ambassador Duvoe
 Otherworld "The Zone Troopers Build Men" (1985) - Perel Sightings
 Star Trek: The Next Generation: "Sarek" (1990) - Sarek
 Star Trek: The Next Generation: "Unification: Part 1" (1991) - Sarek
 In the Heat of the Night: "Legacy" (1993) - Horrace Sloan (final appearance)
 Amazing Space on TLC (1993)

References

External links

 
 

1924 births
1996 deaths
Male actors from Michigan
American people of Russian-Jewish descent
American male film actors
Male actors from Chicago
Military personnel from Chicago
American male television actors
Jewish American male actors
Deaths from multiple myeloma
Deaths from cancer in New York (state)
University of Michigan alumni
20th-century American male actors
People from South Haven, Michigan
United States Army personnel of World War II
United States Army non-commissioned officers
Paratroopers
20th-century American Jews